Plunderer or The Plunderer may refer to:

Plunderer (comics), a character appearing in Marvel Comics publications
Plunderer (manga), a Japanese manga series
The Plunderer (1915 film), an American film
The Plunderer (1924 film), an American film

See also
Plunder (disambiguation)
Penny Plunderer, comics
The Plunderers (disambiguation)